Aphrodinae is a subfamily of leafhoppers in the family Cicadellidae. There are about 7 genera and at least 20 described species in Aphrodinae.

Genera
These seven genera belong to the subfamily Aphrodinae:
 Anoscopus Kirschbaum, 1858 c g b
 Aphrodes Curtis, 1833 c g b
 Driotura Osborn & Ball, 1898 c g b
 Planaphrodes Hamilton, 1975 c g b
 Platymetopius Burmeister, 1838 c g b
 Stroggylocephalus Flor, 1861 c g b
 Xestocephalus Van Duzee, 1892 c g b
Data sources: i = ITIS, c = Catalogue of Life, g = GBIF, b = Bugguide.net

References

Further reading

External links

 

 
Cicadellidae
Hemiptera subfamilies